James Hawkins may refer to:

 James Hawkins (bishop) (died 1807), Irish Anglican bishop
 James Hawkins (organist) (1662–1729), English organist and composer
 James Hawkins (United States Army officer), second lieutenant and field operations leader during the Vietnam War
 Jimmy Hawkins (born 1941), American actor and film producer
 Jim Hawkins (radio presenter) (born 1962), BBC radio presenter
 Jim Hawkins (character), a fictional character in Robert Louis Stevenson's novel Treasure Island
 Jim Hawkins (politician) (born 1949), American politician
 James Hawkins (artist) (born 1954), English painter and filmmaker
 James Boyd Hawkins (1813–1896), American planter and rancher

See also
 James Hawkins-Whitshed (1762–1849), Royal Navy officer
Jim Hawking
 Marshall Hawkins (1924–2010), whose first name is legally James